Curățele is a commune in Bihor County, Crișana, Romania with a population of 2,509 people. It is composed of five villages: Beiușele (Kisbelényes), Cresuia (Kereszély), Curățele, Nimăiești (Nyimesd) and Pocioveliște (Pócsafalva).

References

Communes in Bihor County
Localities in Crișana